Step Dave is a New Zealand comedy-drama television series written by Kate McDermott. It began airing its first series in New Zealand on 11 February 2014. It was renewed for a second series, which began airing on 1 September 2015. Jono Kenyon announced the show would not be returning for a third series.

Premise 
Dave Robinson, a 24-year-old New Zealand bartender, falls in love with Cara Gray, a 39-year-old day spa co-owner with three children.

Cast and characters

Main cast 
 Sia Trokenheim as Cara Gray
 Jono Kenyon as Dave Robinson
 Rawiri Jobe as Aaron "Azza", Dave's flatmate
 Tania Nolan as Julia Deering, Cara's sister
 Aidee Walker as Jenny "Jen", Cara's best friend and business partner

Guest cast 
 Jaime McDermott as Whitney 
 Nic Sampson as Hamish
 Lucinda Hare as Kat
 Andrea Kelland as Lucy
 Jacob Tomuri as Nathan
 Willa O'Neill as Anne-Marie
 Ascia Maybury as Bianca-Faye
 Jason Hood as Steven
 Josh Thomson as Sal
 Jamaica Vaughan as Rose Russell
 Joy Buckle as Pip
 Robert Jozinović as Ryan

Secondary cast
 William Wallace as Phillip Deering, Julia's husband
 Lisa Harrow as Marion Gray, Cara's ex-mother-in-law
 Maya Wyatt as Scarlett Gray, Cara's 16-year-old daughter
 Lily Powell as Jasmine Gray, Cara's 13-year-old daughter
 George Beca as Logan Gray, Cara's 8-year-old son
 J.J. Fong as Betty
 Tainui Tukiwaho as Hugo, Dave's boss

Recurring cast 
 Arlo Gibson as Liam Hamilton
 Richard Lambeth as Dylan
 Peter Muller as Michael
 Kimberley Crossman as Stacey, Dave's ex-girlfriend 
 Nathalie Boltt as Natalie Robinson, Dave's mother
 Francis Mountjoy as Alec
 Millen Baird as Stewart "Stewie" Gray, Cara's ex-husband
 Amanda Tito as Georgia
 Delaney Tabron as Xandra, Hugo's friend 
 Aaron Jeffery as Warren Robinson, Dave's father 
 Shane Cortese as Eugene Russell

Series overview

Series 1 (2014)

Series 2 (2015) 
On 31 July 2014, the show was renewed for a second series of 13 episodes.

International broadcast 
 Australia – Step Dave began airing on GEM from 7 January 2015, however it was pulled from the channel after just one episode. It has since been airing on channel 9 at 2.00am on Fridays since 2016.

U.S. version 
It was announced it is going to get a remake which has been put into development by NBC, which Sean Hayes from Will and Grace will be among the executive producers, alongside South Pacific Pictures' Kelly Martin and Chris Bailey. The American version will be written by Emily Cutler, who has previously worked on The Odd Couple and Community.

DVD release

References

External links 
 
 
 

2010s New Zealand television series
2014 New Zealand television series debuts
2015 New Zealand television series endings
English-language television shows
New Zealand comedy-drama television series
TVNZ 2 original programming
Television series by All3Media
Television series by South Pacific Pictures
Television shows filmed in New Zealand
Television shows funded by NZ on Air
Television shows set in New Zealand